Alexander Martin Kouri Bumachar, (born April 7, 1964), known as Alex Kouri, is a Peruvian lawyer and politician. Throughout his career, he has held multiple offices: president of Beneficiencia del Callao (1990), Congressman (1993-1995), three times elected Mayor of the city of Callao and Governor of Callao region.

He graduated in Law and Political Sciences at Universidad de Lima (Lima University). Law Doctor candidate at Jaen University (Universidad de Jaen), Spain. He holds a master's degree in Security, Crisis and Emergency from IUOG (Instituto Universitario Ortega y Gasset); as well as, Intelligence and Counter-Intelligence; and, Propaganda and Psico-social Operations, in CISDE (Spain). He has also undertaken advanced studies in Fundamental Rights and Globalization at Universidad Complutense (Madrid, Spain). He also teaches in several Peruvian universities, in under- and post- graduate studies.

He is also a published author of various books on Peruvian legislation, governance and security topics.

Education
Alex Kouri graduated in Law and Political Sciences at Universidad de Lima (Lima University). Law Doctor candidate at Jaen University (Universidad de Jaen), Spain. He holds a master's degree in Security, Crisis and Emergency from IUOG (Instituto Universitario Ortega y Gasset); as well as, Intelligence and Counter-Intelligence; and, Propaganda and Psico-social Operations, in CISDE (Spain). He has also undertaken advanced studies in Fundamental Rights and Globalization at Universidad Complutense (Madrid, Spain). Additionally, he studied Administratio of Regional and Local governments at Haifa University in Israel. He also teaches in several Peruvian universities, in under- and post- graduate studies.

Political career
He began his political career as a member of the Christian People's Party, became City Manager of Callao in 1990 and a Congressman in 1993. He then left the CPP to found his own movement, el Movimiento Chim Pum Callao, and was elected as Provincial Mayor three times between 1996 and 2006, then President of the Regional Government of Callao. In February 2010 he announced his candidacy for Mayor of Lima Province, but was later excluded from election to the office.

He is currently serving a five-year jail term on a corruption conviction which shall be re-evaluated in May–June 2017 by the Supreme Court. On 8 July, Alex Kouri presented a Nullity Resource, demanding the nullity of this trial and absolution of this crime. His case is currently held at the Segunda Sala Penal Transitoria of the Supreme Court.

Personal life
His parents are Luis Alberto Kouri Hanna and de Jenny Bumachar Farah. He is the father of 3 children with his partner in life is Andrea Llona Barreda.

Books & Publications
Published author of various books on Peruvian legislation, governance and security topics:
Fenomenología de la legalización de los partidos Bildu/Movadef (July 2013)
Reflexiones - bloqueo de celular es en prisoners de máxima Seguridad (desde la óptica de inteligencia)(July 2016)
Civiam Participationem- mecanismos de participación y control ciudadanos en el Perú (October 2016)
Jurisprudencia constitucional y gobernanza regional y local peruana 1997-2017 (compilación) (April 2017)

See also
 Callao region

References

External links
 
 
 
 

Living people
University of Lima alumni
20th-century Peruvian lawyers
Mayors of Callao
1964 births
Christian People's Party (Peru) politicians
Members of the Democratic Constituent Congress